Jordan Nicolas Miller (born February 1, 1988) is an American football defensive tackle who is currently a free agent. He was originally signed by the Chicago Bears as an undrafted free agent in 2011. He played college football at Southern University.

Professional career

Jacksonville Jaguars
Miller was signed to the Jacksonville Jaguars' practice squad on October 1, 2013. He was promoted to the active roster on December 20.

He was waived/injured by the Jaguars on August 2, 2014 and later was placed on injured reserve. On August 9, he agreed to an injury settlement, releasing him from the team's roster.

New Orleans VooDoo
On April 10, 2015, Miller was assigned to the New Orleans VooDoo of the Arena Football League. On April 14, 2015, he was placed on reassignment. On April 16, 2015, he was placed on league suspension by the VooDoo.

Chicago Eagles
Miller signed with Chicago Eagles of Champions Indoor Football (CIF).

Jacksonville Sharks
On May 25, 2016, was assigned to the Jacksonville Sharks.

Tampa Bay Storm
Miller was assigned to the Tampa Bay Storm in January 2017. The Storm folded in December 2017.

Jordan Miller is currently retired and speaks to aspiring athletes in his free time.

References

External links

Chicago Bears bio
Green Bay Packers bio
Southern Jaguars bio

1988 births
Living people
People from Largo, Maryland
Players of American football from Maryland
American football defensive tackles
Southern Jaguars football players
Chicago Bears players
Green Bay Packers players
Kansas City Chiefs players
Jacksonville Jaguars players
New Orleans VooDoo players
Chicago Eagles players
Jacksonville Sharks players
Tampa Bay Storm players